Arthur Silva Feitoza (born 26 April 1995) is a Brazilian footballer who plays as a defensive midfielder for Kataller Toyama, on loan FC Tokyo.

Career statistics

Club

Notes

References

External links

1995 births
Living people
Brazilian footballers
Brazilian expatriate footballers
Association football midfielders
Clube Atlético Joseense players
Clube Atlético Votuporanguense players
Audax Rio de Janeiro Esporte Clube players
Esporte Clube Novo Hamburgo players
Clube Náutico Marcílio Dias players
FC Tokyo players
Kataller Toyama players
J1 League players
J3 League players
Brazilian expatriate sportspeople in Japan
Expatriate footballers in Japan
People from Boa Vista, Roraima
Sportspeople from Roraima